Willy Zeunert (1882–1969) was a German film editor and production manager.

Selected filmography
 Gentleman on Time (1924)
 The Daredevil (1931)
 Thea Roland (1932)
 The Invisible Front (1932)
 Wedding at Lake Wolfgang (1933)
 A Woman with Power of Attorney (1934)
 What Am I Without You (1934)
 The Affairs of Maupassant (1935)
 Don't Lose Heart, Suzanne! (1935)
 Artist Love (1935)
 My Life for Maria Isabella (1935)
 Family Parade (1936)
 Shoulder Arms (1939)
 The Little Residence (1942)
 The Wedding Hotel (1944)

References

Bibliography 
 John T. Soister. Conrad Veidt on Screen: A Comprehensive Illustrated Filmography. McFarland, 2002.

External links 
 

1882 births
1969 deaths
Film people from Berlin
German film editors